Ponte de Dorna is a bridge in Portugal. It is located in Castro Laboreiro, Viana do Castelo District.

See also
List of bridges in Portugal

Bridges in Viana do Castelo District
Buildings and structures in Melgaço, Portugal